The Maquis du Mont Mouchet were a group of French resistance fighters during the Second World War that were based at Mont Mouchet.

The Germans, having discovered the maquis, made several attacks up until May 1944 with about 3,000 men and using aviation and armoured units. The maquisards fought back fiercely.

Little information is available on the German forces. Historians have identified some units:
 The Jesser Brigade, formed from veterans of the eastern front (deployed in the Orléans-Pithiviers sector)
 Sicherungs-Regiment 1000 
 Aufklärungsabteilung 1000

These were reinforced from:
 Regiment 2 of the 2 Ost-Bataillone of the Freiwilligen-Stamm-Division: 
 The Volga Tatar legion stationed at Puy-en-Velay
 The Azerbaijan legion stationed at Rodez (former 804th battalion ?)
 The 3rd Battalion of the SS Polizei Regiment 19
 A battery of the artillery regiment 28 (189th reserve division)
 Battalion of DCA 958
 3 motorised response detachments of the Feldgendarmerie
 An armored reconnaissance platoon originating from Paris
 2 Luftwaffe squadrons from Aulnat airbase

After several days of combat, the final German attack forced the maquisards to fall back and disperse. Out of revenge for their previous losses, the Germans pillaged several of the surrounding villages, including Clavières.

In the course of the battles, the French Forces of the Interior sustained severe losses: 238 killed and 180 wounded as well as about 100 hostages executed by the Nazis.

Sources 
  Mémoire de la France

National liberation armies
Military history of France during World War II
French Maquis
Battles of World War II involving France
Battles of World War II involving Germany
Guerrilla warfare
Military battles of Vichy France
Uprisings during World War II